The men's 55 kg competition at the 2019 World Weightlifting Championships was held on 18 September 2019.

Schedule

Medalists

Records

Results

New records

References

Results 

Men's 55 kg